Rui Sandro de Carvalho Duarte (born 11 October 1980 in Lisbon) is a Portuguese former professional footballer who played as a right back.

References

External links
 
 
 
 

1980 births
Living people
Portuguese footballers
Footballers from Lisbon
Association football defenders
Primeira Liga players
Liga Portugal 2 players
Segunda Divisão players
Casa Pia A.C. players
G.D. Estoril Praia players
Boavista F.C. players
C.F. Estrela da Amadora players
S.U. 1º Dezembro players
Liga I players
FC Brașov (1936) players
FC Rapid București players
Cypriot First Division players
Anorthosis Famagusta F.C. players
Portuguese expatriate footballers
Expatriate footballers in Romania
Expatriate footballers in Cyprus
Portuguese expatriate sportspeople in Romania
Portuguese expatriate sportspeople in Cyprus